Damion Lyons (born April 28, 1968) is a former Canadian football defensive back in the Canadian Football League who played for the Edmonton Eskimos, Memphis Mad Dogs, Winnipeg Blue Bombers, and BC Lions. He played college football for the UCLA Bruins.

References

1968 births
Living people
American football defensive backs
Canadian football defensive backs
Edmonton Elks players
Memphis Mad Dogs players
Winnipeg Blue Bombers players
BC Lions players
UCLA Bruins football players
Sportspeople from Berkeley, California
Players of American football from Berkeley, California